Ernest A. Michael (August 26, 1925 – April 29, 2013) was a prominent American mathematician known for his work in the field of general topology, most notably for his pioneering research on set-valued mappings. He is credited with developing the theory of continuous selections. Michael is also known in topology for the Michael line, a paracompact space whose product with the topological space of the irrational numbers is not normal. He wrote over 100 papers, mostly in the area of general topology.

Michael was born in Zürich, Switzerland, August 26, 1925, to Ashkenazi Jewish parents, Jacob and Erna Michael. He lived in Berlin, Germany, until 1932. Anticipating the burgeoning threat of Nazism, his family moved to The Hague, Netherlands, and then to New York in 1939. Michael attended Horace Mann High School, graduating at age 15. His undergraduate career at Cornell University was interrupted when he enlisted in the United States Navy (1944–46), where he served aboard the USS Kwajalein. He returned to Cornell, where he received his B.A. in 1947. He earned his M.A. from Harvard University in 1948, and Ph.D. from The University of Chicago in 1951, writing his dissertation titled Locally Multiplicatively-Convex Topological Algebras under the supervision of Irving Segal.

Michael was a member of the Department of Mathematics at the University of Washington (assistant professor 1952–56, associate professor 1956–60, professor 1960) for over 40 years, from 1952 until his retirement in 1993. He was also a visiting scholar at the Institute for Advanced Study (1951–52, 1956–57, 1960–61, 1968–69), ETH Zurich (1973–74) and University of Stuttgart (1978–79).

In 2012 he became an inaugural fellow of the American Mathematical Society.

Michael died in 2013 at the age of 87.

Selected works

References 

20th-century American mathematicians
21st-century American mathematicians
American people of German-Jewish descent
Institute for Advanced Study visiting scholars
Mathematical analysts
Topologists
University of Chicago alumni
Fellows of the American Mathematical Society
1925 births
2013 deaths
Harvard University alumni
Cornell University alumni
Horace Mann School alumni
Mathematicians from New York (state)